Robert Needham, 1st Viscount Kilmorey (c. 1565 – 1631) was an English politician and a peer in the peerage of Ireland.

Biography
He was the eldest son of Robert Needham of Shavington Hall, near Adderley, in Shropshire, educated at Shrewsbury School (1577) and St John's College, Cambridge (1582) and trained in the law at the Inner Temple in 1583. He served in Ireland and was knighted by the Lord Deputy of Ireland in 1594. He succeeded his father in 1603, inheriting Shavington Hall at Adderley, Shropshire.

He was appointed a Justice of the Peace for Shropshire by 1596, a deputy lieutenant of the county in 1600 and High Sheriff of Shropshire for 1606–07. He was a member of the Council in the Marches of Wales in 1609 and vice-president of the council in 1614. He was a Member (MP) of the Parliament of England for Shropshire in 1593 and 1604. He was created Viscount Kilmorey in 1625.

He died in 1631 and was buried at Adderley. He was succeeded by his elder son, Robert.

Family
Viscount Kilmorey was married four times:
He married, firstly, Jane Lacy, daughter of John Lacy, circa 10 August 1586. They had a son Robert.
He married, secondly, Anne Doyley before 14 October 1594.
He married, thirdly, Catherine Robinson, daughter of John Robinson.
He married fourthly 1629/31 the twice widowed Dorothy, daughter of Ambrose Smith of Cheapside.

Notes

References

Sources
 
 
 , Endnotes:

1560s births
1631 deaths
People educated at Shrewsbury School
Alumni of St John's College, Cambridge
High Sheriffs of Shropshire
English MPs 1593
English MPs 1604–1611
English justices of the peace
Viscounts in the Peerage of Ireland
Peers of Ireland created by Charles I